The Son of Joseph is a 2016 Franco-Belgian drama film written and directed by Eugène Green. It was screened in the Forum section of the 66th Berlin International Film Festival.

Cast 
 Victor Ezenfis as Vincent
 Natacha Régnier as Marie
 Fabrizio Rongione as Joseph
 Mathieu Amalric as Oscar Pormenor
 Maria de Medeiros as Violette Tréfouille
 Julia de Gasquet as Bernadette
 Jacques Bonnaffé as Peasant
 Christelle Prot as Philomène
 Adrien Michaux as Philibert
 Louise Moaty as an actress
 Claire Lefilliâtre as a singer
 Vincent Dumestre as a theorbist

References

External links 
 

2016 films
2016 drama films
2010s French-language films
French drama films
Belgian drama films
Christianity in fiction
Films directed by Eugène Green
French-language Belgian films
2010s French films